Persona 5: The Animation is an anime television series produced by CloverWorks based on the Persona 5 video game by Atlus. The anime series is directed by Masashi Ishihama and written by Shinichi Inotsume, with Tomomi Ishikawa adapting Shigenori Soejima's original character designs for the animation. Atlus employee Kazuma Kaneko created the original demon designs, while music composer Shoji Meguro reprised his role from the game.

The 26-episode series aired in Japan between April and September 2018, followed by four special episodes; one aired in December 2018, a second in March 2019, and two more releases bundled with the Blu-Ray releases in May and June 2019. Additionally, an animated television special by A-1 Pictures, The Day Breakers, aired prior to the game's Japanese release in September 2016. The series is licensed in North America by Aniplex of America.

Voice cast

While most of the voice cast from the original game reprise their roles, several voice actors from the original game were replaced. In the Japanese dub, Miyu Matsuki and Kazunari Tanaka, the voice actors of Chihaya Mifune and Junya Kaneshiro respectively, died in 2015 and 2016, so they were recast by Haruka Terui and Takahiro Fujimoto. In the English dub, Shinya Oda is voiced by Eden Riegel (who also voices Hifumi Togo), rather than Barbara Goodson.

Production
The anime television special The Day Breakers was announced in September 2015 during Atlus' stage event at the Tokyo Game Show. In July 2016, the title of the special was revealed as Persona 5: The Animation – The Day Breakers with Takaharu Ozaki as the director, Shinichi Inotsume as writer, Toshiyuki Yahagi and Keita Matsumoto as the character designers and A-1 Pictures as the studio. It premiered on September 3, 2016 with a runtime of 24 minutes on Tokyo MX, later airing on GTV, GYT and BS11. Aniplex of America licensed the special in North America in October 2016.

The 26-episode anime television series adaptation was announced in July 2017 for a 2018 premiere, with CloverWorks animating the series. The anime series is directed by Masashi Ishihama and written by Inotsume, and features adapted character and demon designs from the game by Tomomi Ishikawa and Kazuma Kaneko, respectively. The soundtrack was written by the game's original lead composer Shoji Meguro, who wrote both new material and arranged music from the game. Lyn performs the series' opening and ending themes; the opening themes are "Break In to Break Out" (episode 1–13) and "Dark Sun" (episode 14–26), while the ending themes are "Infinity" (episodes 2–13), "Found a Light" (episode 8), and "Autonomy" (episode 14–26). The series aired on Tokyo MX and other networks from April 7 to September 30, 2018. The first half of the epilogue to the series, titled Dark Sun..., aired on December 30, 2018. A second TV special, titled Stars and Ours and listed as the second half of the epilogue, was aired on March 23, 2019. Two final special episodes were announced to be included as extras with the 11th and 12th Blu-Ray/DVD volumes of the series.

Aniplex of America has also licensed the series in North America with Crunchyroll simulcasting it. Aniplex of America released the complete series on Blu-ray on September 29, 2020, including an English dub with the cast from the game reprising their roles. Despite the release of Blu-ray, the English dub was available early on August 18 as digital release exclusively on Funimation, which all 26 episodes including 2 special episodes available on that date. Anime Limited acquired the home video and digital rights to the series for the United Kingdom. Channel 4 will stream the English Dub on their All 4 on-demand platform for the United Kingdom and Republic of Ireland.

Madman Entertainment will release the series in Australia and New Zealand.

Episodes

Reception
The anime received mixed reception. Joe Ballard from CBR praised the anime for the portrayal of the characters that stays true to the original game. However, he criticized the pacing as it doesn't allow the time for those character developments to truly affect the audience. He also criticized how most of the female characters are subjected to excess fan service moments. He finds  the shots from purposely sexualized camera angles are unnecessary and demeaning, stating that "it feels like a slap in the face to their personal struggles, especially considering one of the palace storylines revolves around physical and sexual abuse and the resulting mental health struggles." Megan Gudman from the same site praised the anime for bringing back Lyn and Shoji Meguro's music and the expand of Ren and Akechi's relationship, but criticized the dull animation and its poor handling of the Confidant characters. USGamer criticized Joker's relatively silent personality in the anime adaptation, negatively comparing him to the more talkative Yu Narukami in Persona 4: The Animation.

Notes

References

External links
 
 
 

2018 anime television series debuts
Anime television series based on video games
Tokyo MX original programming
CloverWorks
Megami Tensei anime
Persona (series)
Persona 5